is a Japanese former Nippon Professional Baseball pitcher.  Sotokoba threw a perfect game in 1968. He was also inducted into the Japanese Baseball Hall of Fame in 2013.

References 

1945 births
Living people
Baseball people from Kagoshima Prefecture 
Japanese baseball players
Nippon Professional Baseball pitchers
Hiroshima Carp players
Hiroshima Toyo Carp players
Nippon Professional Baseball pitchers who have pitched a perfect game
Japanese baseball coaches
Nippon Professional Baseball coaches
Japanese Baseball Hall of Fame inductees